Rosewood railway station is located on the Main line railway in Queensland, Australia. It serves the town of Rosewood.

History
The now-closed Marburg branch railway line split from the Main Line railway at Rosewood.

Services
Rosewood is the western terminus of the electrified Brisbane City network. It is the terminus for all services to/from Ipswich, with some peak-hour services continuing to Bowen Hills and Caboolture.

Rosewood is served by Queensland Rail Travel's twice weekly Westlander travelling between Brisbane and Charleville.

Services by platform

Transport Links
Bus Queensland Lockyer Valley operate one route to and from Rosewood station:
539: to Helidon
This route was once serviced by McCafferty's Express Coaches (now operating under the auspices of Greyhound Australia) which continued onto Toowoomba where it connected with the rail motor service from Toowoomba to Roma which operated until 1993.

References

External links

Rosewood station Queensland Rail
Rosewood station Queensland's Railways on the Internet
[ Rosewood station] TransLink travel information

Railway stations in Australia opened in 1865
Railway stations in Ipswich City
Rosewood, Queensland
Main Line railway, Queensland